Howard Phillips may refer to:
Howard Phillips (politician) (1941–2013), three-time United States presidential candidate
Howard Phillips (consultant), American video game consultant and producer
Howard Phillips (philanthropist) (1902–1979), American businessman and philanthropist in Florida
Howard Phillips (cricketer) (1872–1960), English cricketer
Howard Baron Phillips (1909–1985), baritone with Ray Nobel and His Orchestra

See also
H. P. Lovecraft (Howard Phillips Lovecraft, 1890–1937), fiction author